The Delimara Transmitter was a relay station of Deutsche Welle near Cyclops on Malta. It was used as short- and medium wave transmission site. For the medium wave transmissions, which took place on 1557 kHz with a transmission power of 600 kW, it had two guyed masts, insulated against ground, which were guyed with polymeric guyes. The short wave antennas were mounted on free-standing lattice towers. Direction was achieved by different slewing of the various antennae available.

Originally, the medium wave antenna consisted of three masts, each 88 metres tall, but at one mast one (Parafil) guy melted as a result of the high electric field values halfway up from the anchor point. Unfortunately there was also a storm at this time, which resulted in mast collapse. This was later replaced. 

Delimara Transmitter was shut down in 1996. The site is now a nature reserve.

References

Sources
 http://www.waniewski.de/MW/Malta/index.htm

Broadcast transmitters
Communications in Malta
Marsaxlokk
Towers in Malta
Former radio masts and towers
1996 disestablishments in Malta